The Chocobo series is a collection of video games published by Square, and later by Square Enix, featuring a recurring creature from the Final Fantasy series, the Chocobo, as the protagonist. The creature is a large and normally flightless bird which first appeared in Final Fantasy II and has been featured in almost all subsequent Final Fantasy games, as well as making cameo appearances in numerous other games. The Chocobo series of video games contains over 20 titles for video game consoles, mobile phones, and online platforms. These games include installments of the Mystery Dungeon series of roguelike video games, racing games, adventure games, and minigame collections. Although the various games of the series have different game styles and are generally unrelated except by their inclusion of a Chocobo as the main character, Square Enix considers them to be a distinct series.

The first game in the series, Chocobo no Fushigina Dungeon, is a Mystery Dungeon game released in 1997, while the latest is Chocobo's Mystery Dungeon Every Buddy, released in 2019. A new game, Chocobo GP, is planned for release in 2022. In addition to Square and Square Enix, the games have been developed by several other companies, including h.a.n.d., Bottle Cube, and Smile-Lab. Eight albums of music from Chocobo games have been produced and published by Square Enix, DigiCube, and Toshiba EMI, and an additional album of Chocobo-related music from both the Chocobo and Final Fantasy series, Compi de Chocobo, was released in 2013.

Games

Music

References

External links
Official Chocobo game series website for Japan 

 
Chocobo